Advances in Complex Systems (ACS) is a peer-reviewed journal published quarterly by World Scientific providing a multidisciplinary perspective to the study of complex systems. The journal was founded in 1997 and aims to "promote cross-fertilization of ideas among all the scientific disciplines having to deal with their own complex systems".

Papers in ACS are divided into five sections, each managed by a separate editor: Physics and Mathematics; Computer Sciences; Biological Systems; Social and Economic Systems; and Traffic and Environmental Systems.

Abstracting and indexing 
The journal is indexed in Mathematical Reviews, CSA Human Population and the Environment Abstracts, CSA Risk Abstracts, Zentralblatt MATH, Science Citation Index Expanded, CompuMath Citation Index, Current Contents/Physical, Chemical & Earth Sciences, ISI Alerting Services, and Inspec.

References 

Publications established in 1998
English-language journals
World Scientific academic journals
Quarterly journals
Multidisciplinary scientific journals